Valentine Fondongbeze Atem (born August 26, 1978 in Kumba) is a professional Cameroonian footballer who played as a striker for Tiko United.

Career
Atem played formerly for the German club SV Wehen-Wiesbaden since July 2007. Before he had signed a contract there, he played for Eintracht Braunschweig. In 2003, he represented his club Mount Cameroon FC in the African Champions League and was the captain of the team. He left MSV Duisburg after six months on 30 January 2009 and joined Azerbaijani club Neftchi Baku PFC, signing a contract until 30 June 2009.

References

External links
 

Cameroonian footballers
1978 births
Living people
Expatriate footballers in Azerbaijan
Eintracht Braunschweig players
SV Wehen Wiesbaden players
Expatriate footballers in Ghana
MSV Duisburg players
Expatriate footballers in Germany
Ashanti Gold SC players
Mount Cameroon F.C. players
2011 African Nations Championship players
Ghana Premier League players
2. Bundesliga players
Association football forwards
Neftçi PFK players
Cameroonian expatriate sportspeople in Azerbaijan
Cameroon A' international footballers